New Berlin is a village in Chenango County, New York, United States. The population was 1,028 at the  census. The village is by the eastern town line of the town of New Berlin and is northeast of Norwich.

History 
The village was incorporated in 1816. The name of the village and town are believed to relate to the city, Berlin in Germany, due to the number of early German settlers. The true origin of the name comes from one of its earliest settlers' heritage in Berlin, New York, or Berlin, Connecticut.

The Horace O. Moss House was listed on the National Register of Historic Places in 1974.  The New Berlin Historic District was listed in 1982.

Education
 Milford Academy
 Unadilla Valley School

Geography
New Berlin village is located near the northeastern corner of the town of New Berlin at  (42.6241, -75.3334). It is adjacent to the Unadilla River, a south-flowing tributary of the Susquehanna River, and is at the border of Otsego County.

The village is situated where conjoined Routes NY-8 and NY-80 separate, with NY-8 going south and NY-80 going east. County Road 29 enters the village from the west.

Demographics

As of the census of 2000, there were 1,129 people, 425 households, and 266 families residing in the village. The population density was 1,047.0 people per square mile (403.6/km2). There were 487 housing units at an average density of 451.6 per square mile (174.1/km2). The racial makeup of the village was 97.87% White, 0.35% Black or African American, 0.27% Native American, 0.27% Asian, 0.18% from other races, and 1.06% from two or more races. Hispanic or Latino of any race were 0.89% of the population.

There were 425 households, out of which 28.9% had children under the age of 18 living with them, 49.4% were married couples living together, 10.4% had a female householder with no husband present, and 37.4% were non-families. 32.9% of all households were made up of individuals, and 20.7% had someone living alone who was 65 years of age or older. The average household size was 2.45 and the average family size was 2.98.

In the village, the population was spread out, with 24.1% under the age of 18, 4.9% from 18 to 24, 24.3% from 25 to 44, 23.6% from 45 to 64, and 23.1% who were 65 years of age or older. The median age was 42 years. For every 100 females, there were 80.9 males. For every 100 females age 18 and over, there were 76.7 males.

The median income for a household in the village was $27,885, and the median income for a family was $36,786. Males had a median income of $26,750 versus $21,000 for females. The per capita income for the village was $15,344. About 10.1% of families and 18.5% of the population were below the poverty line, including 29.8% of those under age 18 and 11.4% of those age 65 or over.

References

External links
 Village of New Berlin official website
 Historical and other information about New Berlin
  Brief information about New Berlin

Villages in New York (state)
Populated places established in 1816
Villages in Chenango County, New York
1816 establishments in New York (state)